Ivan Levaï (born 18 March 1937) is a French journalist. He has occupied many positions in radio, television and press journalism. For several years he presented the review of the press in the morning news show on France Inter radio. As of 2011 he presents a press review on France Inter on Saturday and Sunday mornings.

He was the first husband of Anne Sinclair with whom he has two sons.

Works
And why not? : morality and business / François Michelin; an interview with Ivan Levaï and Yves Messarovitch ; translated by Marc Sebanc. c2003. French edition: Et pourquoi pas? / François Michelin ; avec Ivan Levaï et Yves Messarovitch. 1998.  	
La république des mots: de Mendès France à Chirac, dans les allées du pouvoir c2001. 	
La Résistance en France. 1998 	
La Seconde guerre mondiale : histoire parallèle ; La Résistance en France : une épopée de la liberté. 1997. 	
Vous devriez mettre une cravate bleue : politiques et médias: il faut tout changer!. 2002

References

1937 births
Living people
Writers from Budapest
French Jews
French male journalists
French people of Hungarian-Jewish descent
French radio journalists
French radio presenters
Hungarian emigrants to France
Hungarian Jews